Mormyrus longirostris, commonly referred as the eastern bottle-nosed mormyrid, is a medium-sized ray-finned fish species belonging to the family Mormyridae. It was originally described by Wilhelm Peters in Monatsberichte der Akad. Wiss. Berlin, 1852.

The dorsal fin is more than twice the length of the anal fin. The dorsal origin is nearer to the tip of the snout than to the caudal fin base.

Ecology 
It primarily feeds on weeds and insects, but also on small vertebrates, such as small fish and fish eggs. They hunt using electricity and can give a mild electric shock to defend itself.

Range and habit 
M. longirostris can be found in abundance across the plains of Africa in freshwater habitats, including the lower and middle  Zambezi, lower Sabi and Ludi rivers and in the Luapula-Moero-Bangwelo (Zambian Congo system). It inhabits the Ruvuma and Rufiji rivers in Tanzania, lakes Malawi, Tanganyika and Rukwa and other eastward-flowing rivers in Tanzania.

The species lives in caves and muddy areas with soft bottoms. It hides in weeds and characteristically forms small shoals.

Life history/behavior 
Active mostly at night, it breeds during the summer rainy season, moving upstream in rivers after water has receded, with migrations at irregular intervals. Females carry 10,000–70,000 eggs at a time.

Relationship to humans 
The fish is harvested for food with bait and hook.

References

External links 
 

Mormyrus
Freshwater fish of Africa
Fish described in 1852
Taxa named by Wilhelm Peters